HDE may refer to:

 HDE Controller X, a computer program
 Hedge End railway station, in England
 Henry Draper Extension, an astronomical catalogue
 High dose estrogen, a hormonal therapy
 Higher Diploma in Education
 Home Defence Executive
 Humanitarian Device Exemption